Tarva Chapel is a chapel in Ørland municipality in Trøndelag county, Norway. It is located at Nordbuen on the island of Husøya, the largest of the Tarva. It is an annex chapel in the Nes parish which is part of the Fosen prosti (deanery) in the Diocese of Nidaros. The small, brown, wooden church was built in a long church style in 1972 by the people on the island. The church seats about 55 people.

History
The chapel was built on the site of the island's cemetery which was opened in 1921. The new chapel was completed in 1972 and consecrated on 8 October 1972. The altarpiece is said to have a picture painted by Sigvald A. Pettersen in 1972 with a motif from the stable in Bethlehem.

See also
List of churches in Nidaros

References

Ørland
Churches in Trøndelag
Wooden churches in Norway
Long churches in Norway
20th-century Church of Norway church buildings
Churches completed in 1972
1972 establishments in Norway